The 1939 24 Hours of Le Mans was the 16th Grand Prix of Endurance, and took place at Circuit de la Sarthe, Le Mans, France, on 17 and 18 June 1939. The 1939 programme cover depicted the raising of six nations' flags: France, Italy, Great Britain (its civil Red Ensign), Belgium, Germany, and the United States.

By June 1939, the outbreak of World War II was less than three months away. The following year's 24 Hours of Le Mans was originally planned for June 1940, but due to the invasion of France in May the race was called off.  Endurance racing would not return to Le Mans until 1949, four years after V-E day ended World War II in Europe.

Official results
Class winners are denoted with bold.

Statistics
 Fastest Lap: #15 Robert Mazaud – 5:12.1
 Distance: 
 Average Speed:

Trophy winners
 14th Rudge-Whitworth Biennial Cup – #39 Gordini
 Index of Performance – #39 Gordini

References

24 Hours of Le Mans races
Le Mans
1939 in French motorsport